Eslamabad (also Romanized as Eslāmābād; also known as  Sheitan Abad Dowl, Sheydān, and Sheyţānābād) is a Kurdish village in Dul Rural District, in the Central District of Urmia County, West Azerbaijan Province, Iran. At the 2006 census, its population was 514, in 137 families.

References 

Populated places in Urmia County